The raid at Altenburg on 28 September 1813 took place during the War of the Sixth Coalition's German Campaign of 1813. The raid was carried out by the Streifkorp under the command of Saxon General Johann von Thielmann commanding seven regiments of Cossacks, a squadron each of Saxon Hussars and Dragoons, and a detachment of Saxon Freikorps numbering about 1,500 cavalry. The objective of the raid was to attempt harassment of the French lines of communication 25 miles (45 km) south of Leipzig shortly before the Battle of Leipzig. The Austrian contingent was commanded by Emmanuel Mensdorff and the Russian contingent of Cossacks by Matvei Platov.

Background
The battle was the culmination of a raid in which Thielmann cavalry successfully attacked Napoleon's lines of communications along the roads between Erfurt and Leipzig in the Saale valley.

Battle
Thielmann completely surprised and routed a larger force of French cavalry, including Cavalry of the Imperial Guard and a small force of 2nd Baden Infantry Regiment (Infanterie-Regiment No.2 ‘Markgraf Wilhelm’) nominally under the command of Lefebvre-Desnouettes numbering some 8,000. The French, completely surprised, broke and fled from Altenburg losing a third of their number (2,100), in the process running over the Baden infantry which was taken prisoner despite attempting to resist. Thielmann's force lost about 200 in casualties.

Notes

References

External links
 

Battles of the War of the Sixth Coalition
Battles of the Napoleonic Wars
Battles involving Austria
Battles involving France
Battles involving Prussia
Battles involving Russia
Conflicts in 1813
September 1813 events
Battles in Thuringia